The Small Box Girder bridge (SBG) was a small assault bridge that could be used to span gaps of up to 30 feet. It was typically carried on a tank, such as the Churchill Armoured Vehicle Royal Engineers (AVRE), and could be deployed without engineers having to expose themselves to enemy fire. The design had been formally adopted by the British Army in 1932. Pre-war the SBG had (more often than not without permission) quickly been copied by many countries around the world, including ironically Germany. The German Army called their version of the SBG the Kastenträgergerät (K-Gerät for short). The United States was another country whose army created their own copy, designating it the H-20.

The SBG was used during the Normandy invasion of World War II (1944–5).

See also
Armoured vehicle-launched bridge
Hobart's Funnies
Box girder bridge
M60 AVLB
M104 Wolverine
M1074 Joint Assault Bridge

References

1932 introductions
Portable bridges
Box girder bridges
World War II military equipment of the United Kingdom
English inventions